Super H can refer to:

Super H, A North American supermarket chain, part of the Hmart group
SuperH, a brand name of a certain microcontroller and microprocessor architecture